Kimberly Moore (born October 20, 1967 in Kirkland Lake, Ontario) is a Canadian curler  from St. Catharines, Ontario.

In 1997, Moore played second for 1990 Tournament of Hearts champion Alison Goring. At the Hearts that year, the team lost in the final game to Sandra Schmirler. It was Moore's first Hearts appearance. Moore would later leave the Goring team, to skip her own team, and by 2006 she joined the Sherry Middaugh rink. Moore won her second provincial title in 2008, playing for Middaugh. Moore stopped curling competitively after the 2009-10 season.

References

External links
 

Living people
1967 births
Sportspeople from Kirkland Lake
Curlers from Ontario
Canadian women curlers
Canadian educators
Sportspeople from St. Catharines
Canada Cup (curling) participants